The ochre bush squirrel (Paraxerus ochraceus) is a species of rodent in the family Sciuridae found in Kenya, Somalia, and Tanzania. Its natural habitat is dry savanna.

References

Paraxerus
Mammals described in 1880
Taxonomy articles created by Polbot